The following are a list of Saturn Award nominees & winners for Best Television Presentation. The award was introduced in 1994.

Breaking Bad, The Walking Dead and Doctor Who are the only series to have won the award twice; additionally, Breaking Bad and The Walking Dead have both won the award for Best Syndicated/Cable Television Series several times. Doctor Who (2005) is the most nominated series in the category, with five nominations.

As of the 47th Saturn Awards, the category is known as Best Streaming Limited Event Television Series.

Winners and nominees

1990s

2000s

2010s

2020s

External links
Official Site
Internet Movie Database: 21st, 22nd, 23rd, 24th, 25th, 26th, 27th, 28th, 29th, 30th, 31st, 32nd, 33rd, 34th, 35th, 36th, 37th, 38th, 39th, 40th, 41st

Television Presentation